Cidaris cidaris is a species of sea urchin commonly known as the long-spine slate pen sea urchin. It is found in deep water in the eastern Atlantic Ocean and the Mediterranean Sea.

Description
Cidaris cidaris has a small central test from which project a number of long, blunt, widely separated primary spines and a dense covering of short secondary spines. The primaries are pale grey, tipped with green and the secondaries are pale green. The sea urchin often has bits of algae, sponge or other organisms adhering to the spines.

Distribution
Cidaris cidaris is found in the eastern Atlantic Ocean and the Mediterranean Sea in deep water on coral, rock and gravel bottoms. Its range extends from Cape Verde, the Azores and the Canary Islands northwards to the Faroe Islands and Norway.

Biology
Cidaris cidaris feeds on sponges, sea fans and algae.

Cidaris cidaris is one of a number of species of sea urchin that can suffer from bald sea urchin disease.

See also
 Cidaris abyssicola

References

Animals described in 1758
Cidaridae
Taxa named by Carl Linnaeus